Ray Woodard (born August 20, 1961) is a former American football defensive tackle and former head football coach at Lamar University. He was hired on May 19, 2008 to resurrect the Lamar Cardinals football program that was discontinued in 1989. Woodard played college football at Kilgore College and Texas, was selected 199th overall in the 1984 NFL Draft. He spent the next five seasons with the San Diego Chargers, Denver Broncos and Kansas City Chiefs. He was a member of the Broncos' 1986 AFC Champion and Super Bowl team.

Woodard received his bachelor's degree in kinesiology and history from Sam Houston State University in 1988.  He received his masters in education from the University of Texas at Tyler in 1991.  On October 23, 2014, Ray Woodard earned his Doctorate in Educational Leadership from Lamar University.  He joined a select group of Division I coaches with doctorates.  Including Woodard, there were six Division I coaches with a doctorate at the time he received his doctorate.  One of those six was an honorary doctorate.  Woodard was also one of three Division I (FCS) coaches with a doctorate.

Coaching career

Professional teams
Woodard coached with several professional teams, starting with the Texas Terror of the Arena Football League in 1996, and then the Frankfurt Galaxy of the World League of American Football (WLAF) in 1997. In 1999, he served as head coach of the Houston Outlaws of the short-lived Regional Football League. In 2000, he was the head coach for the Houston Marshals of the Spring Football League. Woodard later served as the defensive coordinator for the Scottish Claymores of the WLAF from 2000 to 2003.

Navarro College
From 2005 to 2007, Woodard spent his time coaching at Navarro College, a two-year college whose main campus is in Corsicana, Texas. His first two seasons at Navarro were spent as a defensive coordinator and as head coach in his last season. His 2007 squad went 9–3 and advanced to the conference playoffs for the first time in six seasons.

Navarro defeated defending national champion Blinn College on consecutive weeks before rolling past Kilgore College — the Southwest Junior College Football Conference (SWJCFC) regular-season champion — on the road, 54–28, to earn the school's first bowl bid since the 1990s.

Navarro claimed a 24–21 win over Georgia Military College in the Pilgrim's Pride Bowl to finish the year ranked fourth in the NJCAA national poll. For his efforts, Woodard was named the SWJCFC Coach of the Year.

Navarro ranked third nationally in total offense (444.6 yards per game), fourth in rushing offense (250.5 ypg) and 16th in passing offense (194.2 ypg), while scoring a school-record 428 points for an average of 35.7 per game in 2007.

Lamar University
In 2008, Lamar University hired Ray Woodard to help bring football back to Lamar after an almost 20-year absence. The Lamar Cardinals football team played their first season in 2010 under coach Woodard. That season, the Cardinals went 5–6 as Division I independents.  The Cardinals began football competition in the NCAA Division I FCS Southland Conference the following year. On November 21, 2016 at approximately 1:30pm, Woodard was informed he was no longer head coach for Lamar.

Head coaching record

College

References

1961 births
Living people
American football defensive tackles
Denver Broncos players
Frankfurt Galaxy coaches
Houston Thunderbears coaches
Kansas City Chiefs players
Kilgore Rangers football players
Lamar Cardinals football coaches
Scottish Claymores coaches
Texas Longhorns football players
High school football coaches in Texas
Junior college football coaches in the United States
Lamar University alumni
Sam Houston State University alumni
University of Texas at Tyler alumni
People from Lufkin, Texas
Players of American football from Texas
Navarro Bulldogs football coaches
National Football League replacement players